A pernach (or) is a type of flanged mace originating in the 12th century in the region of Kievan Rus' and later widely used throughout Europe. The name comes from the Slavic word перо (pero) meaning feather, referring to a type of pernach resembling an arrow with feathering.

Among a variety of similar weapons developed in 12th-century Persian- and Turkic-dominated areas, the pernach became pre-eminent, being capable of penetrating plate armour and plate mail.

A pernach or shestoper ("six-feathered") was often carried as a ceremonial mace of rank by certain Eastern European military commanders, including Polish magnates, Ukrainian Cossack colonels and sotniks (cf. centurion).

In Ukraine it symbolized the authority of Colonels (polkovnyk, regional leaders or military officers) unlike another mace bulawa that was associated with Hetman.

References

Clubs (weapon)
Medieval weapons
Ukrainian inventions

lt:Plunksnius